Walter Fleming may refer to:

 Walther Flemming (1843–1905), German scientist
 Walter Lynwood Fleming (1874–1932), American historian
SS Walter L. Fleming, a Liberty ship
 Walter M. Fleming (1839–?), American physician and surgeon